Djedhor, better known as Teos or Tachos, was an ancient Egyptian pharaoh of the 30th Dynasty.

Biography
A son of his predecessor Nectanebo I, Teos was his co-regent for three years before ascending to the throne in 361–60 BCE.

Expedition against Persians
Nectanebo's success in the Nile Delta against the invading Persian armies in 374–73 BCE encouraged Teos to start to plan a military expedition into Palestine and Phoenicia, which were territories controlled by the Persians. Taking advantage of a moment of weakness for the Achaemenid Empire due to riots in some satrapies in Asia Minor, Teos sought assistance from both the octogenarian king Agesilaus II of Sparta and the Athenian general Chabrias, including a number of mercenaries and 200 triremes, from Greece. However, to finance such an expedition, Teos had to impose new taxes and to expropriate the goods of the temples, destroying the delicate balance artfully established by his father Nectanebo. This action ensured to Teos both the required finances and a great unpopularity.

The operation against the Persians started with Chabrias as the admiral of the fleet, Agesilaus as the commander of the Greek mercenaries and Teos's nephew Nakhthorheb as the leader of the machimoi (Diodorus Siculus, certainly exaggerating, claimed that the machimoi were 80,000 in number). Teos placed himself in the supreme command of the expedition (the position claimed by Agesilaus) leaving his brother Tjahapimu, the father of Nakhthorheb, in Egypt as his regent. The expedition made its way to Phoenicia without particular problems.

Betrayal and end

Unfortunately for Teos, his brother Tjahapimu was plotting against him. Taking advantage of Teos's unpopularity, and with the support of the priestly classes, Tjahapimu convinced his son Nakhthorheb to rebel against Teos and to make himself pharaoh. Nakhthorheb persuaded Agesilaus to join his side by taking advantage of the several disagreements that had arisen between the Spartan king and the pharaoh. Nakhthorheb was acclaimed pharaoh – better known today as Nectanebo II – and the betrayed Teos had no alternative but to flee to Susa, the court of his enemies.

Knowledge of the final fate of Teos comes from the inscription by a noble called Wennefer, who also participated in Teos's unfortunate expedition as a physician. Wennefer was sent by Nectanebo II in search of Teos and managed to have him held by the Persian king Artaxerxes II at Susa. Wennefer then had Teos brought back with him in chains to the Egyptian pharaoh.

Sources

Bibliography

External links

Livius.org: Teos

4th-century BC Pharaohs
Pharaohs of the Thirtieth Dynasty of Egypt
4th-century BC Egyptian people